Adolf Müller (11 April 1914 – 7 July 2005) was a Swiss freestyle wrestler who won a bronze medal in the featherweight division at the 1948 Olympics.

References

External links
 

1914 births
2005 deaths
Wrestlers at the 1948 Summer Olympics
Swiss male sport wrestlers
Olympic wrestlers of Switzerland
Olympic bronze medalists for Switzerland
Olympic medalists in wrestling
Medalists at the 1948 Summer Olympics